Gilbert Smith (1869 – after 1893) was an English professional footballer who played in the Football League for Small Heath. Born in Oldbury, which was then part of Worcestershire, Smith was recommended to Small Heath by Fred Wheldon, and given a run of games at right back in the 1893–94 season. He was no improvement on other candidates for the position, and he returned to the reserves, and thence to non-league football with Berwick Rangers (Worcester) in 1894.

Honours
 Football League Second Division runners-up: 1893–94

References

1869 births
Year of death missing
People from Oldbury, West Midlands
English footballers
Association football fullbacks
Birmingham City F.C. players
Worcester City F.C. players
English Football League players
Date of birth missing
Place of death missing